The 2013–14 Ethiopian Premier League is the 68th season of the Ethiopian Premier League since its establishment in 1944. A total of 14 teams are contesting the league.

Clubs 
Arba Minch City F.C. (a.k.a. Arba Minch Kenema)
Awassa City FC (a.k.a. Awassa Kenema)
Banks SC (a.k.a. Ethiopia Nigd Bank) (Addis Abeba)
Dashen Beer FC (Gondar)
Dedebit (Addis Abeba)
Defence (a.k.a. Mekelakeya) (Addis Abeba)
EEPCO (a.k.a. Mebrat Hayl) (Addis Abeba)
Ethiopian Coffee (a.k.a. Ethiopian Bunna) (Addis Abeba)
Ethiopian Insurance (Addis Abeba)
Harrar Beer Botling FC (a.k.a. Harar Bira)
Muger Cement (a.k.a. Muger Cemento) (Oromiya)
Saint-George SA (a.k.a. Kedus Giorgis) (Addis Abeba)
Sidama Coffee (a.k.a. Sidama Bunna) (Awassa)
Welayta Dicha (Sodo)

League table

References

External links
www.khanua.jimdo.com
www.ethiofootball.com
Ethiosports

Premier League
Premier League
Ethiopian Premier League
Ethiopian Premier League